Advanced Digital Forensic Solutions, Inc. (ADF Solutions) is a company based in Bethesda, Maryland, that develops tools for scanning suspect computers and digital devices in order to locate and extract data, a process known as digital forensics. Digital forensic tools can scan mobile phones, computers and digital devices to collect intelligence or evidence of a crime to identify computers that contain content relevant to an investigation. 

Triage-G2 is a media exploitation (MEDEX) tool used on computers and peripheral devices. It is typically deployed on a USB device by military personnel working in the field. The USB devices, known as triage keys, can be prepared in advance or in the field by selecting specific search criteria. The users of this tool do not require significant technical computer skills. Triage-G2 is currently in use by several U.S. Defense and intelligence agencies.

Mobile Device Investigator provides field investigators with rapid evidence collection, analysis and reporting for iOS and Android devices (smartphones, tablets) to recover call records, messages, saved contacts, calendar data, browsing history, download history, search terms, WiFi connections, installed applications, pictures, videos, audio files, documents and more. Police and investigators can review and analyze results immediately so they can make on-scene decisions. 

Digital Evidence Investigator is a forensic triage tool used on computers by forensic examiners in lab environments or on location to scan suspect devices and prioritize them for full examinations. Digital Evidence Investigator is in use by law enforcement agencies worldwide.

The software used in this technology employs sets of search criteria known as Captures. This software allows analysts and operators to describe the specific search or exploitation they want to conduct.  They can also be used to automate recurring categories of investigations and can be shared among the agencies that need them.

Document and media exploitation 
According to technopedia.com, document and media exploitation is defined as the extraction, translation, and analysis of physical and digital documents and media to generate useful and timely information. Also known as DOMEX, it is a very similar discipline to computer forensics, digital forensics or media exploitation.

References

External links

Computer security companies